Merab Gigauri (born 5 January 1993) is a Georgian football player who currently plays for FC Torpedo Kutaisi.

Career

Club
Gigauri made his Ekstraklasa debut for Jagiellonia Białystok on 26 November 2011 in a game against ŁKS Łódź as a 58th-minute substitute for Hermes.

On 27 June 2019, Gigauri signed a one-year contract with Gabala.

International
Gigauri made his debut for Georgia national football team on 5 June 2013 in a friendly against Denmark.

Career statistics

Club

Honours
Torpedo Kutaisi
Georgian Cup: 2022

References

External links
 
 
 

1993 births
Footballers from Tbilisi
Living people
Footballers from Georgia (country)
Association football midfielders
Georgia (country) youth international footballers
Georgia (country) under-21 international footballers
Georgia (country) international footballers
FC Torpedo Kutaisi players
Jagiellonia Białystok players
FC Metalurgi Rustavi players
FC Spartaki Tskhinvali players
FC Kolkheti-1913 Poti players
Gabala FC players
Azerbaijan Premier League players
Expatriate footballers in Azerbaijan
Erovnuli Liga players
Ekstraklasa players
Expatriate footballers from Georgia (country)
Expatriate footballers in Poland
Expatriate sportspeople from Georgia (country) in Azerbaijan